Tin bromide can refer to either of the following chemical compounds:

Tin(II) bromide, SnBr2
Tin(IV) bromide, SnBr4